The Suffolk Premier Cup is the top level football cup competition organised by the Suffolk FA. It is currently open to clubs competing at the Eastern Counties League Premier Division level and above. Suffolk's only professional football club, Ipswich Town, enters a reserve team.

Past finals

References

External links
Suffolk Premier Cup Suffolk FA
All Results Suffolk FA
Suffolk Premier Cup Football Club History Database

County Cup competitions
Football in Suffolk